Will Geer (born William Aughe Ghere; March 9, 1902 – April 22, 1978) was an American actor, musician, and social activist, who was active in labor organizing and other movements in New York and Southern California in the 1930s and 1940s. In California he befriended rising singer Woody Guthrie. They both lived in New York for a time in the 1940s. He was blacklisted in the 1950s by Hollywood after refusing, in testimony before Congress, to name persons who had joined the Communist Party.

In his later years, he was well known for his role as the grandfather figure Zebulon Walton in the TV series The Waltons until his death.

Early life
Geer was born in Frankfort, Indiana, the son of Katherine (née Aughe), a teacher, and Roy Aaron Ghere, a postal worker. His father left the family when he was 11 years old. He was deeply influenced by his grandfather, who taught him the botanical names of the plants in his native state. Geer started out to become a botanist, studying the subject and obtaining a master's degree at the University of Chicago. While at Chicago, he was a member of Lambda Chi Alpha fraternity.

Career
Anglicizing his name, Geer began his acting career touring in tent shows and on riverboats. He worked on several left-oriented documentaries, including narrating Sheldon Dick's Men and Dust, about silicosis among miners.

He created the role of Mr. Mister in Marc Blitzstein's 1937 The Cradle Will Rock, played Candy in John Steinbeck's theatrical adaptation of his novella Of Mice and Men, and appeared in numerous plays and revues throughout the 1940s. From 1948 to 1951, he appeared in more than a dozen movies, including Winchester '73 (as Wyatt Earp), Broken Arrow, Comanche Territory (all 1950) and Bright Victory (1951).

He became a dedicated activist, touring government work camps of the Civilian Conservation Corps in the 1930s with folk singers such as Burl Ives and Woody Guthrie (whom he introduced to the People's World and the Daily Worker). In 1956, the duo released an album together on Folkways Records, titled Bound for Glory: Songs and Stories of Woody Guthrie.  In his biography, Harry Hay described Geer's activism and  their activities while organizing for the strike. He is credited with introducing Guthrie to Pete Seeger at the 'Grapes of Wrath' benefit which he organized in 1940 for migrant farm workers.

He acted with the Group Theatre (New York) studying under Harold Clurman, Cheryl Crawford and Lee Strasberg. He acted in radio, appearing as Mephistopheles (the Devil) in the 1938 and 1944 productions of Norman Corwin's The Plot to Overthrow Christmas. He also acted in the radio soap opera Bright Horizon.

Blacklist
Geer was blacklisted in the early 1950s for refusing to testify before the House Committee on Un-American Activities. As a result, he appeared in very few films over the next decade. Among them was Salt of the Earth (1954) which starred and was produced, directed and written by blacklisted Hollywood personnel. It told the story of a miners' strike in New Mexico from a pro-union standpoint. The film was denounced as "subversive", and faced difficulties in its production and distribution as a consequence.

Later years
In 1951, Geer founded the Will Geer Theatricum Botanicum in Topanga, California, with his wife, actress Herta Ware. He combined his acting and botanical careers at the Theatricum, cultivating every plant mentioned in Shakespeare's plays.

During the late 1950s and early 1960s, he played several seasons at the American Shakespeare Festival in Stratford, Connecticut. In addition, he created a second Shakespeare Garden on the theater's grounds.

By this time, he was working sporadically again on Broadway. In 1964, he was nominated for the Tony Award for Best Featured Actor in a Musical for 110 in the Shade. In 1967 he performed a soliloquy as the prosecutor delivering the closing argument against the two murderers in the film In Cold Blood. In 1972, he  played the part of Bear Claw in Jeremiah Johnson.  

In 1972, he was cast as Zebulon Walton, the family patriarch on The Waltons, a role he took over from Edgar Bergen, who played the character in the TV movie upon which the series was based. He won an Emmy for Outstanding Supporting Actor in a Drama Series for The Waltons in 1975.
When he died, shortly after completing the sixth season of The Waltons, the death of his character was written into the show's script. His final episode, the last episode of the 1977–1978 season, depicted his being reunited with his onscreen wife Esther (played by Ellen Corby; she had been absent for the entire season, due to a stroke). His character was mourned onscreen during the first episode of the 1978–1979 season, titled "The Empty Nest".

Personal life
Geer married actress Herta Ware in 1934. He and Ware had three children, Kate Geer, Thad Geer, and actress Ellen Geer. Ware also had a daughter, actress Melora Marshall, from another marriage. Although he and Ware divorced in 1954, they remained close for the rest of their lives.

In 1934 he met Harry Hay at the Tony Pastor Theatre where Geer worked as an actor. They became lovers. He and Hay participated in a milk strike in Los Angeles. Later that year, he and Hay performed in support of the San Francisco General Strike, where they witnessed police firing on strikers, killing two. He was a committed leftist, with Hay later describing him as his political mentor. He introduced Hay to Los Angeles' leftist community, and together they took part in activism, joining demonstrations for laborers' rights and the unemployed, and on one occasion handcuffed themselves to lampposts outside UCLA to hand out leaflets for the American League Against War and Fascism. He became a member of the Communist Party of the United States in 1934. After Hay had become increasingly politicized, Geer introduced him to the Party. In 1934, he and Hay gave support to a labor strike of the port of San Francisco, part of the 1934 West Coast waterfront strike. Geer became a reader of the West Coast Communist newspaper People's World.

He maintained a garden at his vacation house, called Geer-Gore Gardens, in Nichols, Connecticut. He visited often and attended the local Fourth of July fireworks celebrations, sometimes wearing a black top hat or straw hat and always his trademark denim overalls with only one suspender hooked. He also had a small vacation house in Solana Beach, California, where his front and back yards were cultivated as vegetable gardens rather than lawns.

As he was dying on April 22, 1978, of respiratory failure at the age of 76, his family sang Woody Guthrie's "This Land Is Your Land" and recited poems by Robert Frost at his deathbed. His remains were cremated; his ashes are buried at the Theatricum Botanicum in the Shakespeare Garden in Topanga Canyon, California.

TV and filmography

Misleading Lady (1932) as McMahon – Asylum Guard
Spitfire (1934) as West Fry
Wild Gold (1934) as Poker Player (uncredited)
The Mystery of Edwin Drood (1935) as Village Lamplighter (uncredited)
Union Pacific (1939) as Foreman (uncredited)
The Fight for Life (1940) as 2nd Teacher
Deep Waters (1948) as Nick Driver
The Chevrolet Tele-Theatre (1948) as Sam Hobbs
Johnny Allegro (1949) as Schultzy
Lust for Gold (1949) as Deputy Ray Covin
Anna Lucasta (1949) as Noah
Intruder in the Dust (1949) as Sheriff Hampton
The Kid from Texas (1950) as O'Fallon
Comanche Territory (1950) as Dan'l Seeger
Winchester '73 (1950) as Wyatt Earp
It's a Small World (1950) as William Musk – Father
Broken Arrow (1950) as Ben Slade
Convicted (1950) as Convict Mapes
To Please a Lady (1950) as Jack Mackay
Double Crossbones (1951) as Tom Botts
Bright Victory (1951) as Mr. Lawrence Nevins
The Tall Target (1951) as Homer Crowley – Train Conductor
Racket Squad (1951) as Harry Robinson
The Barefoot Mailman (1951) as Dan Paget – Miami Mayor / Postmaster
Salt of the Earth (1954) as Sheriff
The Searchers (1956)
Mobs, Inc. (1956) as Harry Robinson (archive footage)
Advise and Consent (1962) as Senate Minority Leader
East Side/West Side (1964) as Brian Lincoln
Black Like Me (1964) as Truckdriver
The Trials of O'Brien (1966) as Judge Lindemann / Sheldon
Seconds (1966) as Old Man
The Crucible (1967) as Giles
Garrison's Gorillas (1967) as Laski
In Cold Blood (1967) as Prosecutor
The President's Analyst (1967) as Dr. Lee-Evans
I Spy (1968) as Uncle Harry
Run for Your Life (1968) as Judge David P. Andrews
Of Mice and Men  (1968) as Candy
Mission: Impossible (1968) as Doc
The Invaders (1968) as Hank Willis
Bandolero! (1968) as Pop Chaney
Gunsmoke (1968) as Slocum
Certain Honorable Men (1968) as Malcolm Stoddard
Mayberry R.F.D. (1969) as Captain Wolford
Here Come the Brides (1969) as Benjamin Pruitt
Bonanza (1969–1971) as Ferris Callahan / Zach Randolph / Calvin Butler
Hawaii Five-O (1969) as Professor Harold Lochner
Then Came Bronson (1969) as Oliver Hidemann
Daniel Boone  (1969) as Adam
The Reivers (1969) as Boss McCaslin
I Walk The Line (1970) (Grandpa Tawes voice dub)
The Name of the Game  (1970) as Mac
The Moonshine War (1970) as Mr. Baylor
The Brotherhood of the Bell (1970) as Mike Patterson
Pieces of Dreams (1970) as The Bishop
The Bold Ones: The Senator (1970–1971) as Elliot Leveridge / Judge Scanlon / Ralph Turner
The Bill Cosby Show (1970) as Mr. Kane
Medical Center (1970–1974) as Coughlin
Shooting the Moonshine War (1970) as Himself (uncredited)
The Bold Ones: The Lawyers (1970–1971) as Elliot Leveridge / Judge Scanlon / Ralph Turner
Sam Hill: Who Killed Mr. Foster?  (1971) as Simon Anderson
Love, American Style (1971) as Desk Clerk (segment "Love and the Pulitzer Prize")
Brother John (1971) as Doc Thomas
Cade's County (1971) as Hurley Gaines
Alias Smith and Jones (1971) as Seth
O'Hara, U.S. Treasury (1971) as Singlefoot
The Jimmy Stewart Show (1971) as Uncle Everett
The Waltons (TV series) (1972–1978) as Zebulon Tyler Walton
Dear Dead Delilah (1972) as Roy Jurroe
The Scarecrow (1972) as Justice Gilead Merton
Bewitched (1972) as President George Washington
The Sixth Sense (TV series) (1972) as Rev. Jordan
Jeremiah Johnson (1972) as Bear Claw
The Rowdyman (1972) as Stan
Napoleon and Samantha (1972) as Grandpa
Night Gallery (1973) as Walt Peckinpah
Columbo: A Stitch in Crime (1973) as Dr. Edmund Hidemann
Brock's Last Case (1973) as J. Smiley Krenshaw
Harry O (1973) as Len McNeil
Savage (1973) as Joel Ryker
The Gift of Terror (Made for TV Film) (1973) as Ben
Kung Fu (1973) as Judge Emmitt Marcus
Isn't It Shocking? (1973) as Lemuel Lovell
Doc Elliot (1973) as Paul Bartlett
Executive Action (1973) as Harold Ferguson
The Hanged Man (1974) as Nameless
Silence (1974) as Crazy Jack
Honky Tonk (1974) as Judge Cotton
Memory of Us (1974) as Motel Manager
Hurricane (1974) as Dr. McCutcheon
The Manchu Eagle Murder Caper Mystery (1975) as Dr. Simpson
The Night That Panicked America  (1975) as Reverend Davis
The Blue Bird (1976) as Grandfather
Law and Order (1976) as Pat Crowley
Moving Violation (1976) as Rockfield
Hollywood on Trial (1976) as Himself
Starsky & Hutch (1976) as Commodore Atwater
Hee Haw (1976) as Himself
The Billion Dollar Hobo (1977) as Choo-Choo Trayne
Eight Is Enough (1977) as Sam
The Love Boat (1977) as Franklyn Bootherstone
A Woman Called Moses (1978) as Thomas Garrett
Unknown Powers (1978) as Host
CBS: On the Air (1978)
The Mafu Cage (1979) as Zom

Discography

Folkways: The Original Vision (2005) Smithsonian Folkways
Ecology Won: Readings by Will Geer and Ellen Geer (1978) Folkways Records
Woody's Story: As Told by Will Geer and Sung by Dick Wingfield (1976) Folkways Records
American History in Ballad and Song, Vol.2 (1962) Folkways Records
Mark Twain: Readings from the Stories and from "Huckleberry Finn" (1961) Folkways Records
Hootenanny at Carnegie Hall (1960) Folkways Records
Bound for Glory: Songs and Stories of Woody Guthrie (1956) Folkways Records

References

External links 

 
 
 
 
 Discography  of Will Geer on Folkways

1902 births
1978 deaths
20th-century American male actors
American male film actors
American male musical theatre actors
American male stage actors
American male television actors
Bisexual male actors
Deaths from respiratory failure
Hollywood blacklist
LGBT people from Indiana
Male actors from Indiana
Male actors from Los Angeles County, California
Members of the Communist Party USA
Outstanding Performance by a Supporting Actor in a Drama Series Primetime Emmy Award winners
People from Frankfort, Indiana
People from Topanga, California
20th-century American male singers
20th-century American singers
American communists
American bisexual actors
American activists
University of Chicago alumni
American botanists
People from Trumbull, Connecticut
People from Solana Beach, California
The Waltons